There are 137 local government areas of Western Australia (LGAs), which are areas, towns and districts in Western Australia that manage their own affairs to the extent permitted by the Local Government Act 1995. The Local Government Act 1995 also makes provision for regional local governments (referred to as "regional councils", established by two or more local governments for a particular purpose.

There are three classifications of local government in Western Australia:

 City predominantly urban, some larger regional centres
 Town predominantly inner urban, plus Port Hedland
 Shire predominantly rural or outer suburban areas

The Shire of Christmas Island and the Shire of Cocos (Keeling) Islands are Federal external territories and covered by the Indian Ocean Territories Administration of Laws Act, which allows the Western Australian Local Government Act to apply "on-island" as though it were a Commonwealth act. Nonetheless, Christmas Island and the Cocos (Keeling) Islands are not part of Western Australia.

History 
Land was originally granted in the Swan River Colony under regulations which allowed for land commissioners to assess a tax on private allotments to fund the construction and maintenance of "roads, paths and plantations". As the Colony began to develop, the first form of local government was established in some areas under the Towns Improvement Act of 1838. These trusts were empowered to elect ratepayers as Trustees and assess and collect a property tax for the construction of roads. Many of these town trusts, including the Perth town trust, experienced severe administrative and financial difficulties, and in some cases barely functioned at all. The Guildford Town Trust lasted only a couple of years before ceasing to function until it was reconstituted in 1863.

The District Roads Act and Municipal Institutions Act, both of 1871 improved matters by allowing for the establishment of Roads Boards and Municipal Corporations. Municipal Corporations had the capacity to levy property taxes, pass municipal by-laws and undertake various local regulatory services previously carried out by colonial officials and other central bodies. Corporations could also establish civic institutions and facilities with the governors' consent, including libraries and botanical gardens. Road Boards where strictly limited to the construction of roads, could not levy property taxes and depended on colonial government grants for any expenditures.

Women were permitted to be elected to Road Boards from 1911 and to Municipal Corporations from 1919. The influence of town clerk WE Bold and the greater Perth movement around this time led to the amalgamation of inner city local governments to create a greatly expanded City of Perth until 1993, when the City was broken up once again.

The first local government department was established by the state in 1949 to guide local government authorities. Following the war local governments increasingly expanded their services from property, health and local infrastructure (roads, drainage) to community and social services. This was termed the “New Order” at the time, and encompassed the development of community centres, infant health clinics and sporting facilities.

Only a few cities Perth, Fremantle, Subiaco, South Perth and Nedlands existed prior to 1961. On 1 July 1961, all road districts became shires, and all municipalities became towns or cities. This structure has continued till the present day.

In the 1970s, the scope of local government services expanded to encompass the provision of nursing homes and other forms of aged care.

During the late 1980s, and early 1990s a bi-partisan reform process led to the Local Government Act 1995, which amongst other changes, established for the first time a clear separation of responsibility between elected councillors and local government administration. Other key changes included a significant reduction in the number of decisions requiring ministerial approval which allowed for streamlined decision-making and greater local government autonomy.

Although successive state governments have periodically promoted municipal amalgamation, only a small number of local governments have merged over the course of Western Australia's history. Historically most local governments have strongly resisted forced amalgamations and the total number of authorities has declined only marginally over the last century. The most recent state government led effort to encourage the voluntary amalgamation of 30 metropolitan local governments into 16 was abandoned by the Barnett government in 2014.

In 2017 the McGowan government initiated a review process to reform the Local Government Act 1995.

Metropolitan LGAs

Non-metropolitan LGAs

Regional local government organisations 
Bunbury Harvey Regional Council, comprising the LGAs of City of Bunbury and Shire of Harvey
Eastern Metropolitan Regional Council, comprising the LGAs of Town of Bassendean, City of Bayswater, City of Belmont, City of Kalamunda, Shire of Mundaring and City of Swan
Mindarie Regional Council, comprising the LGAs of Town of Cambridge, City of Joondalup, City of Perth, City of Stirling, Town of Victoria Park, City of Vincent and City of Wanneroo
Murchison Regional Vermin Council, comprising the LGAs of Shire of Cue, Shire of Meekatharra, Shire of Mount Magnet, Shire of Sandstone and Shire of Yalgoo
Pilbara Regional Council, comprising the LGAs of Shire of Ashburton, Shire of East Pilbara, City of Karratha and Town of Port Hedland
Rivers Regional Council, comprising the LGAs of City of Armadale, City of Gosnells, City of Mandurah, Shire of Murray, Shire of Serpentine–Jarrahdale and City of South Perth
Southern Metropolitan Regional Council, comprising the LGAs of City of Cockburn, Town of East Fremantle, City of Fremantle, City of Kwinana and City of Melville
Tamala Park Regional Council, comprising the LGAs of Town of Cambridge, City of Joondalup, City of Perth, City of Stirling, Town of Victoria Park, City of Vincent and City of Wanneroo
Warren Blackwood Alliance of Councils, comprising the LGAs of Shire of Bridgetown–Greenbushes, Shire of Boyup Brook, Shire of Donnybrook–Balingup, Shire of Manjimup and Shire of Nannup 
Western Metropolitan Regional Council, comprising the LGAs of Town of Claremont, Town of Cottesloe, Town of Mosman Park, Shire of Peppermint Grove and City of Subiaco

References

External links 
 

 
Western Australia-related lists